The Edwards Gymnasium/Pfieffer Natatorium on S. Sandusky St. on the main campus of Ohio Wesleyan University was built in 1905.  It was designed by architect J.W. Yost and was built by Feick & Son.

It has a stone entry portico and a "dominant" red tile roof with dormers

Building is named for alumnus John Edwards of Leipsic, Ohio.

It is located at the south end of the campus.

References

School buildings on the National Register of Historic Places in Ohio
Buildings and structures completed in 1905
Ohio Wesleyan University buildings
National Register of Historic Places in Delaware County, Ohio
1905 establishments in Ohio